Pope's keelback (Hebius popei) is a species of snake in the family Colubridae. The species is found in Vietnam and southern China.

Etymology
The specific name, popei, is in honor of American herpetologist Clifford H. Pope.

Geographic range
H. popei is found in southern China (including the island of Hainan) and northern Vietnam.

Habitat

Reproduction
H. popei is oviparous.

References

Further reading
Malnate EV (1960). "Systematic Division and Evolution of the Colubrid Snake Genus Natrix, with Comments on the Subfamily Natricinae". Proceedings of the Academy of Natural Sciences of Philadelphia 112 (3): 41–71. (Amphiesma popei, new combination).
Schmidt KP (1925). "New Reptiles and a new Salamander from China". American Museum Novitates (157): 1–5. (Natrix popei, new species, p. 3).

Hebius
Snakes of China
Snakes of Vietnam
Reptiles described in 1925
Taxa named by Karl Patterson Schmidt